The Department for Planning and Infrastructure was a department of the Government of Western Australia that was responsible for implementing the state's planning, infrastructure and transport policies during the Gallop and Carpenter governments. It was formed on 1 July 2001 by the amalgamation of the Ministry for Planning and the Department of Transport.

It also oversaw the following authorities: -

Western Australian Planning Commission
Public Transport Authority

On 1 July 2009, the department was reformed into the new Department of Transport and Department of Planning, with State Land Services and Pastoral Leases being transferred to the newly formed Department of Regional Development and Lands.

See also
 Planning and Development Act 2005
 Urban planning in Australia

Notes

External links
 Department of Transport (Formerly the Department for Planning and Infrastructure)

Planning
2001 establishments in Australia
2009 disestablishments in Australia